Zwekapin United Football Club (also spelled Zwegabin) is a Burmese football club, based in Hpa-An, Myanmar. Founded in 2010, the club is competing in the 2010 season of the Myanmar National League.

Recent domestic league and cup history

Current squad

References

External links
 First Eleven Journal 
 Soccer Myanmar 

Football clubs in Myanmar
Association football clubs established in 2010
Myanmar National League clubs
Myanmar Premier League clubs
2010 establishments in Myanmar